This article is an episode list for House of Anubis, a mystery/comedy-drama television series broadcast on Nickelodeon. 

On March 10, 2011, Nickelodeon confirmed that it would make a second season of House of Anubis at its annual Upfront presentation to advertisers and media. On June 29, 2011, Entertainment Weekly came with the news that Nickelodeon had ordered a second season from production company Studio 100. They started shooting on July 21, 2011, in Liverpool.

Season 3 of House of Anubis was confirmed on April 16, 2012, the same day as the Nick UK Season 2 premiere. Filming for the third season began in July 2012. The third season premiered in the U.S. on January 3, 2013. The series has aired 76 episodes (160 segments). It became the first Nickelodeon series to reach over 100 episodes and not be a sitcom. The promo on Nickelodeon (UK and Ireland) was released on February 11, 2013 during the UK and Irish premiere of Dance Academy. It premiered in April 2013. 

In Season 3, a major cast change occurred after the departure of Nathalia Ramos at the conclusion of the previous season and Ana Mulvoy-Ten, who left the series in Episode 10 of Season 3. Instead, two new actresses joined the cast – Alexandra Shipp and Louisa Connolly-Burnham.

A special episode of House of Anubis titled "Touchstone of Ra" aired on June 14, 2013 (UK) and June 17, 2013 (U.S.) as the conclusion of the series.

Series overview

Episodes

Season 1 (2011) 
This season stars Nathalia Ramos as Nina Martin, Brad Kavanagh as Fabian Rutter, Jade Ramsey as Patricia Williamson, Ana Mulvoy-Ten as Amber Millington, Tasie Dhanraj as Mara Jaffray, Bobby Lockwood as Mick Campbell, Eugene Simon as Jerome Clarke, and Alex Sawyer as Alfie Lewis, and Klariza Clayton as Joy Mercer.
This season was filmed from July 2010 to December 2010.
Bobby Lockwood is absent for six episodes (18–19, 38–40, 47).
Klariza Clayton has been absent for 51 episodes (2–29, 35, 38–46, 48–57).
Tasie Dhanraj has been absent one episode (15).

{{Episode table
 |background=#800518
 |overall=7
 |season=7
 |title=31
 |writer=20
 |director=20
 |airdate=15
 |episodes=

{{Episode list 
|Title= House of Hush/House of Spies/House of Sting/House of Never/House of Forever
|WrittenBy=Diane Whitley & Danny Spring
|DirectedBy=Tim Hopewell
|OriginalAirDate=
|EpisodeNumber=56–60
|EpisodeNumber2=56–60
|ShortSummary=Rufus escapes and Jerome asks Nina to protect him from Rufus. Amber receives her first invitation to the prom – a message on her profile from "King Tut". She reckons it is a boy with a thing about Egyptology and worries that this means Jason or even Fabian. She decides to let Fabian down easily when he says he hasn't asked anyone yet. Nina arrives and he gets nervous. Then Amber realizes "King Tut" is full of himself and thinks it is Jerome. Jerome makes a joke about it and embarrasses her in front of the house. Fabian asks Nina to the prom and she accepts. Meanwhile, Sibuna tries to assemble the Cup, but they find that it is not that simple. Thanks to Jerome, Nina and her friends realize that not only is there a Chosen Hour in which the Cup of Ankh must be assembled, but also a Chosen One (who they assume is Joy) the only person who can restore the Cup to its former shape and power. However, Victor knows this too, and the Chosen Hour is almost upon them. The night of the prom arrives, and Amber still doesn't have a dress or a date, until "King Tut" reveals himself to be Alfie, with a dress for her that was stolen by Jerome. However, prom is the least of Sibuna's worries as the teachers prepare for the Chosen Hour and Rufus springs his final trap. Joy is captured by her father, Victor, and the others in the Society of Ankh order her to assemble the Cup as the Chosen Hour arrives. Meanwhile, a gloating Rufus tells Nina and Sibuna that not even Victor knows the full consequences of drinking from the Cup of Immortality. Joy fails in her attempts to assemble the cup, and she realizes that she isn't the Chosen One. Meanwhile, Sibuna escapes Rufus and they make it back to the house. They find that Nina and Joy share the same birthday, but Joy says that her birthday was at 7PM while Nina was born at 7AM – the true seventh hour. They discover that Nina is the Chosen One and she reassembles the Cup, only to have it taken by Rufus, who returns. After Rufus drinks from it, he puts it in the fire and leaves. It turns out that Fabian switched the real elixir of life with a fake one and threw the real one away. Upon hearing this, Victor is devastated. The kids all leave to go to the prom, accepting that the quest is over. However, when Nina was about to leave the house, she hears Sarah's voice telling her to go back and that it is not over yet. Nina finds out the Cup is not destroyed after all. Sarah tells Nina to bury the Cup of Ankh and to make sure that no one finds it. After burying the Cup, she goes to the dance. Amber chooses the Prom King and Queen to be Fabian and Nina. Nina and Fabian dance and finally have their first kiss. Then the episode ends with the camera panning down to reveal the Cup of Ankh glowing buried underneath the stage.

Guest star(s): Francis Magee as Victor Rodenmaar Jr., Mina Anwar as Trudy Rehmann, Julia Deakin as Daphne Andrews, Paul Antony-Barber as Eric Sweet, Jack Donnelly as Jason Winkler, Roger Barclay as Rufus Zeno, Catherine Bailey as Esther Robinson, Sheri-An Davis as Nurse Delia, and Michael Lumsden as Frederick Mercer. 

Viewers (in millions): 2.504

Last appearance of Jack Donnelly as Jason Winkler, Rita Davies as Sarah Frobisher-Smythe, Catherine Bailey as Esther Robinson, Sher-An Davis as Nurse Delia, and Michael Lumsden as Frederick Mercer.
|LineColor = 800517
}}
}}

  Season 2 (2012) 
This season was filmed from July 2011 to January 2012.
This season stars Nathalia Ramos as Nina, Brad Kavanagh as Fabian, Jade Ramsey as Patricia, Ana Mulvoy Ten as Amber, Eugene Simon as Jerome, Alex Sawyer as Alfie, Tasie Dhanraj as Mara, Bobby Lockwood as Mick, Klariza Clayton as Joy, and Burkely Duffield as Eddie. 
Burkely Duffield joins the main cast in episode 15. He was absent for 5 episodes. (35, 37–38, 55-56)
Bobby Lockwood was absent for 73 episodes. (3, 22, 13–81, 84–86)
Klariza Clayton was absent for 8 episodes. (9, 31–34, 53–54)
Alex Sawyer was absent for 3 episodes. (19, 53–54)
Eugene Simon was absent for 2 episodes. (55–56)
Tasie Dhanraj was absent for 4 episodes. (3, 35, 41, 58)

  Season 3: The Reawakening (2013) 
 This season is subtitled The Reawakening.
 The season stars Brad Kavanagh as Fabian, Jade Ramsey as Patricia, Ana Mulvoy Ten as Amber episodes (1–10), Eugene Simon as Jerome, Alex Sawyer as Alfie, Tasie Lawrence as Mara, Klariza Clayton as Joy, Burkely Duffield as Eddie, Alexandra Shipp as KT, and Louisa Connolly-Burnham as Willow. 
 Nathalia Ramos and Bobby Lockwood did not return to the series.
 Episodes are now 23 minutes each. (The first twelve episodes were aired over 6 weeks on Nickelodeon in an hour form, meaning 2 episodes aired on Nick every Thursday).
 The season was filmed from July 2012 through late January/early February 2013.
 There were 40 episodes in the season, adding up to a series total of 190 episodes.
Susy Kane joined the cast this season as Caroline Denby, a new teacher who lives in the gatehouse. 
Tasie Dhanraj is now credited by her stage name Tasie Lawrence in the opening credits.
Ana Mulvoy Ten leaves cast and doesn't appear in 30 episodes. (11–40)
Francis Magee as Victor has been present in all episodes.
Louisa Connolly-Burnham as Willow is absent for 2 episode (5,10).

  Special: The Touchstone of Ra (2013) 

 On May 21, 2013, Nickelodeon announced a special episode of House of Anubis'', "Touchstone of Ra".
 On June 14, 2013, the special premiered on Nickelodeon (UK & Ireland), ahead of the U.S. premiere on TeenNick on June 17, 2013, and reached 90,000 views in UK and Ireland. Ratings of the premiere in other countries were never announced.

References

General references
 Showatch at The Futon Critic 
 House of Anubis: Episode Guide (Archived) at Zap2it

External links 
 
 
 

Lists of American fantasy television series episodes
Lists of Nickelodeon television series episodes